The Third Government of the Republic of Croatia or The Government of National Unity (Croatian: Vlada nacionalnog jedinstva) was the Croatian Government cabinet led by Prime Minister Franjo Gregurić. It was announced on 17 July 1991 in response to the escalation of the Croatian War of Independence. It was the 3rd cabinet of Croatia since the first multi-party elections, and its term ended on 12 August 1992 after the first parliamentary election under the 1990 Croatian Constitution. During the term of this cabinet Croatia gained internationally diplomatic recognition and became a member of the United Nations.

A major reshuffle in its make-up came in mid-April 1992, when government ministers Enzo Tireli, Vlatko Pavletić, Bernardo Jurlina, Petar Kriste, Ivan Vekić and Ante Čović left the cabinet and were replaced by Franjo Kajfež, Vesna Girardi-Jurkić, Josip Juras, Branko Mikša, Ivan Jarnjak and Jure Radić. In addition, three new ministers without portfolio were named on the same day: Ivica Crnić, Darko Čargonja and Mladen Vedriš.

List of ministers and portfolios
The periods in the table fall outside the cabinet's term when the minister listed also served in the preceding or the subsequent cabinets.

References

External links
Official website of the Croatian Government

Greguric, Franjo
1991 establishments in Croatia
1992 disestablishments in Croatia
Cabinets established in 1991
Cabinets disestablished in 1992